The following deaths of notable individuals related to American television occurred in 2020.

January

February

March

April

May

June

July

August

September

October

November

December

References

2020 deaths
Lists of deaths in American television
2020 in American television
Deaths in American television